currentclub Ypiranga .Brazil 

Guilherme "Gui" da Silva Azevedo (born 21 May 2001) is a Brazilian professional footballer who plays as a right winger for Ypiranga Futebol Clube.

Professional career
Azevedo joined the youth academy of Grêmio in 2011, and signed a professional contract with them on 22 May 2019. Azevedo made his professional debut with Grêmio in a 2-1 Campeonato Brasileiro Série A loss to Fluminense FC on 29 September 2019.

Honours
Grêmio
Campeonato Gaúcho: 2021
Recopa Gaúcha: 2021

References

External links
 

2001 births
Living people
Sportspeople from Paraná (state)
Brazilian footballers
Grêmio Foot-Ball Porto Alegrense players
Coritiba Foot Ball Club players
Campeonato Brasileiro Série A players
Campeonato Brasileiro Série B players
Association football forwards
21st-century Brazilian people